Lia Marie Johnson (born November 23, 1996) is an American actress, singer, Internet personality, comedian, gamer, and musician, who in 2014 was profiled by Adweek as one of the "10 biggest young stars on YouTube". She first received recognition for her work on her YouTube channel, where she rose to fame for creating skits and song covers. She also made appearances in the Fine Brothers web series Kids React (2010–2011).

Johnson starred in the sketch comedy series AwesomenessTV (2013–2014), where she was recognized for portraying Terry the Tomboy, whom she also played in the Nickelodeon television movie Terry the Tomboy (2014). In 2015, Johnson made her singing debut with the single "Moment Like You". The following year, she signed with Capitol Records, and released the single "DNA", which was featured in the YouTube Premium film The Thinning (2016), which she also starred in as Ellie Harper, a role she reprised in its sequel The Thinning: New World Order (2018). She also starred in the web series T@gged (2016–2018).

Early life
Johnson was born in Wahiawa, Hawaii. She has four sisters and a brother. Her family eventually settled in California. In 2012, in a combined episode of Teens React and Elders React about the 2012 United States presidential election, Johnson stated that she was a Democrat.

Career
Johnson's YouTube account was created in 2007, with videos uploaded by her mother which featured her performances at talent shows, and church recitals. After two years, Johnson began to control the output of the channel, creating content that has come to include personal commentary, sketch comedy, and musical performances.

In 2010, Johnson began to work with the Fine Brothers as a recurring guest on their Kids React series. This exposure increased the traffic to her own channel and became an early source of her online fame. In the aftermath of the initial series episodes, she was surprised by the phenomenon of strangers knowing her and approaching her as fans, and remarked "I think Kids React was my very first viral video, 'cus everyone knew my name after that."

In 2011, Johnson was added to the recurring cast of the spin-off series Teens React, and in 2014 was moved again to the newly established YouTubers React, which featured herself and various well known YouTube personalities. In 2014, Johnson appeared at the Nickelodeon Kids' Choice Awards, and starred in Terry the Tomboy, a spin-off film based on the eponymous character she portrays on the Nickelodeon sketch comedy series, AwesomenessTV.

In 2015, she covered the single "Latch" by Disclosure, singing with Alejandro Luis Manzano of Boyce Avenue, and released it on YouTube. The song was originally performed by singer Sam Smith. Johnson has also been featured on the covers of Adweek and BYou Magazine. On January 9, 2015, Johnson released her first single, "Moment Like You", along with a music video which can be found on her YouTube channel. She appeared in the music video for Post Malone's single "Go Flex", which was released on April 28, 2016.

On September 28, she explained to her fans that she had signed to Capitol Records, and was continuing to work on the music album she had been recording for the previous two years. The following month she released her first single produced by Howard Benson through Capitol Records titled "DNA" which surpassed 1 million Spotify streams. On February 17, 2017 Johnson released her second single "Cold Heart Killer". The music video for the song was released on March 10, 2017. A year later, Johnson debuted her third single “Champagne” on May 17, 2018.

Starting mid November 2019, Lia teased a new project on her Instagram page, with one promotional photo being posted every day. Seven days later, Lia announced her fourth single titled, "Moonflower," on November 23, 2019. Johnson released her fifth single, “Like a God”, on March 12, 2020.

In the first half of 2021, Johnson began posting personal videos and covers on her YouTube channel again after four years of inactivity. She released the single "Lifts" on January 1, 2021, followed by "Nectar" on March 19 and "Venus Sunrise" on April 30. An accompanying music video was issued for all three songs.

In 2022, Johnson announced she had moved to England with her boyfriend. Following this, in October of the same year, Johnson started teasing upcoming music that she had been preparing for 2023. 

Johnson is in a relationship with English musician, Charlie Hudson. The couple have been seen together since late 2021. The pair also released a duet song in 2021. Hudson is also believed to be managing Johnson, under his company ‘Alter Ego’.

January 2020 streaming incident 
On January 2, 2020, Johnson streamed on Instagram Live in a video of what appeared to be her intoxicated in a room. During the live stream, an older male alleged by those close to Johnson as being her producer since she was 15, Steven Wetherbee, is heard talking and seen wrapping his arms around Johnson and kissing her. The older male then repeatedly asks Johnson whether or not she is on Instagram, warning her to stay off of it as it could damage his career. In a stream later that same evening, a male voice asks about Instagram again, then Instagram Live, and then takes Johnson's phone away. His face is briefly on the stream before it is paused and eventually ends.

Fans reacted to the video with calls to action out of concern that Johnson was suffering potential grooming and abuse from Wetherbee, due to the vast age difference between the two (Johnson being 23 and Wetherbee 67 at the time) and Johnson's recent risqué streams and apparent intoxicated behavior, as well as her song "DNA" which talks about and has visuals of repeating cycles of alcoholism and domestic violence. However, neither Wetherbee nor Johnson have responded to inquiries regarding the incident. Steve Wetherbee's social media profiles have since been deactivated and Johnson's personal YouTube account saw a hiatus for two years after the incident.

In a video released January 4, 2023, Johnson finally opened up about the repeated abuse she suffered and confirmed that her producer at the time took advantage of her during the Instagram Live incident in January 2020. She felt trapped and couldn't get out of the situation, was lured out of her sobriety by Wetherbee, and that going on Instagram Live was a cry for help.

Filmography

Discography

As a lead artist

As a featured artist

Other appearances

Music videos

Awards and nominations

See also
Internet celebrity
List of YouTubers
Social impact of YouTube

References

External links
 
 
 

1996 births
21st-century American actresses
Actresses from California
Actresses from Hawaii
20th-century American singers
20th-century American musicians
American child actresses
American stand-up comedians
Gaming YouTubers
Let's Players
Twitch (service) streamers
American video game actresses
American voice actresses
American film actresses
American television actresses
American women comedians
American musical theatre actresses
American hip hop singers
American rock singers
20th-century American women singers
American women rappers
Warner Records artists
Walt Disney Records artists
Hollywood Records artists
Capitol Records artists
American women drummers
American women guitarists
American women pianists
Rappers from California
Motion capture actresses
OnlyFans creators
Comedians from California
Hawaii Democrats
Living people
People from Honolulu County, Hawaii
American YouTubers
American web series actresses